The Volga Maniac is a Russian serial killer who committed a series of murders against elderly women in and around the region of Tatarstan between 2011 and 2012. Radik Tagirov, a suspect, was arrested in connection to the murders on December 1, 2020.

Murders 
From March 2011 to September 2012, in the Volga and Ural Federal Districts, a number of very similar murders of elderly women occurred. Investigators believe that all crimes were committed by one person, as all victims were single women aged 75 to 90 years old, each living in a Khrushchyovka. According to investigators, the perpetrator infiltrated the apartment, pretending to be an employee of a utilities company or the social service. All victims were strangled with improvised items (for example, a bathroom robe belt) or the murderer's own hands. After the murders, the criminal would steal money and valuables from the apartment. The investigators initially believed that robbery was not a prime motivation for the killer.

The first nine murders took place in Kazan. One of the victims survived, but, being blind, could not describe her attacker. Similar murders took place in Ulyanovsk, Nizhny Novgorod, Izhevsk, Perm (two murders in April 2012) and Samara (two murders in April–May 2012). By August 1, 2012, there were eighteen murders. Between September 25 and 27, 2012, the last three murders were committed in Ufa. The total number of murders is 32.

On September 26, 2012, the alleged perpetrator was captured on a CCTV camera at the entrance of one of his victim's homes. Following this, a facial composite was compiled.

In 2013, a reward of 1 million rubles was promised in return for information beneficial to the investigation. In the same year, a hypothesis was put forward that the killer was hiding in the Sakhalin Oblast.

Investigation into his crimes 
On the night of October 7, 2016, in Kazan, a man suspected of being the criminal was filmed by a video camera in a building on Chuikov Street, but the Investigative Committee denied he was the perpetrator.

On February 6, 2017, the Deputy Head of the Main Criminalistics Directorate of the Criminal Investigation Service of the Russian Federation, Ivan Streltsov, told reporters that the investigators had reason to believe that the person being sought was a resident of Udmurtia. It was also suggested that the man could be using a list of pensioners. At the same time, the investigators did not exclude that the person might be sought in prisons or colonies, or that he was no longer alive.

According to Stretsov, the reward for information that would help establish the identity of the murderer was increased to 3 million rubles.

On March 28, 2017, a 37-year-old Kazakh native was arrested in Samara on suspicion of involvement in the murders, as he had killed two elderly women there on March 25 and 27, 2017.

On May 25, 2017, investigators suggested that the offender was a native of Tatarstan and studied in one of Kazan's schools.

On December 1, 2020, ex-convict Radik Tagirov, was detained and confessed to 25 of the murders. DNA evidence and shoe prints were used to identify him as the murderer. He claimed to be killing the victims "painlessly" in order to survive on the streets. He later recanted his confession, claiming that he slandered himself under stress. His trial began in October 2022. If convicted, he faces a life sentence.

Suspect 
Radik Tagirov was born in the then Tatar Autonomous Soviet Socialist Republic, which later became the Russian republic known as Tatarstan after the collapse of the Soviet Union. After reaching adulthood, Tagirov pursued a locksmithing career in Tatarstan's capital city of Kazan. In 2009, after being convicted on petty theft charges, he spent the next four years as a vagrant who wandered from place to place looking for means to survive on the street and subsidize his addiction to synthetic cannabinoids.

Prior to being arrested by police, Radik lived a somewhat quiet life as a locksmith with two children and a live-in girlfriend.

References

External links 
 "Volga Maniac", who killed 30 old women, is still sought after, but they have not increased the reward
 Zagodorsky Yu. The Monster, Casanova and the Sirota. 7 Perm maniacs and serial killers / Arguments and Facts. "AiF-Prikamie" of August 14, 2015

Male serial killers
Russian serial killers
Violence against women in Russia